Nikolay Dmitrievich Mylnikov (born Yaroslavl, 1797 – died there, 1842) was a Russian portrait painter active during the nineteenth century in the Yaroslavl Governorate.

Together with Grigory Ostrovsky and Ivan Tarkhanov, Mylnikov belongs to a group of "naive" portrait painters from the Upper Volga region that was rediscovered by Savva Yamshchikov in the 1970s.

Mylnikov's only surviving works appear to be a series of portraits of citizens of Yaroslavl, currently held in the Yaroslavl Art Museum; these include several depictions of merchants and their wives and children, as well as a pair of portraits painted for a local landowner.

References

External links 
 

Russian portrait painters
People from Yaroslavl
19th-century painters from the Russian Empire
Russian male painters
1797 births
1842 deaths
19th-century male artists from the Russian Empire